Bruno Bozzetto (born 3 March 1938) is an Italian cartoon animator and film director, creator of many short pieces, mainly of a political or satirical nature. He created his first animated short "Tapum! the weapons' story" in 1958 at the age of 20. His most famous character, a hapless little man named "Signor Rossi" (Mr. Rossi), has been featured in many animated shorts as well as starring in three feature films: Mr. Rossi Looks for Happiness (1976), Mr. Rossi's Dreams (1977), and Mr. Rossi's Vacation (1977).

Biography
In 1965, Bozzetto produced his first feature-length animated film: West and Soda, a parody of American Western films. In 1968, Bozzetto released VIP my Brother Superman, a superhero spin-off. However, his best-known work is probably the 1976 feature film Allegro Non Troppo, a collection of short pieces set to classical music in the manner of Walt Disney's Fantasia, but more humorous in nature, economical in execution and with more sophisticated narrative themes. After a long break, Bozzetto produced a live-action film in 1987, Under the Chinese Restaurant, his last feature film work until assisting on the pilot for Mammuk (2002), an animated film set in prehistoric times (now being produced by Rai Cinema and The Animation Band).

1990 saw the release of Grasshoppers (Cavallette), which was an Academy Award nominee for the Academy Award for Best Animated Short Film in 1991.

In 1995, he produced an animated short for Hanna-Barbera/Cartoon Network Studios' What a Cartoon! series entitled Help? and in 1996, in cooperation with RAI and with the support of Cartoon (Media Programme of the European Union), he created The Spaghetti Family, a 26-episode cartoon television series.

Since 1999, Bozzetto turned to flash cartoons, most notably with the award-winning Europe and Italy, a witty and graphically elegant commentary on European vs. Italian socio-cultural attributes. This comic also inspired the creation of the Polandball meme.

Filmography

Feature films
 West and Soda (1965)
 The SuperVips (Vip - Mio fratello superuomo) (1968)
 Mr. Rossi Looks for Happiness (1976)
 Allegro non troppo (1976)
 Mr. Rossi's Dreams (I sogni del Signor Rossi) (1977)
 Mr. Rossi's Vacation (Le vacanze del Signor Rossi) (1978)
 Sotto il ristorante cinese (1987)

Shorts
This list is only a short sampling of the many shorts Bozzetto has put out over the years.
 Life in a Tin (1967)
 Ego (1969)
 Opera (1973) 
 Self Service (1974)
 Striptease (1977)
 Baby Story (1978)
 Moa Moa (1984)
 Baeus (1987)
 Cavallette (Grasshoppers) (1990)
 Big Bang (1990)
 Dancing (1991)
 Help? (1996)
 Europe & Italy (1999)
 Yes & No - A Dyseducational Road Movie (2001)
 Olympics (2003)
 Mr. Otto in 17 (2004)
 Looo (2004)
 Sex and Fun (2007)
 Camuni (2009)
 EU and USA (2018)
 Ecosystem (2019)

Awards (selected recent)
 (2003) Bergamo International Cinema Festival: Career award (Premio delle mura)
 (2001) Tehran Second International Animation Festival: Special Award of the Jury (“Europe and Italy”)
 (2000) World Festival of Animated Film - Animafest Zagreb: Special Jury Award "for original observation of human diversity"
 (1998) Animafest Zagreb: Life Achievement Award "for outstanding and universal contribution to the development of the art of animation"

References

External links
 
 Bruno Bozzetto's home page
 Lambiek page
 "Yes/No" flash cartoon satire on safe driving
 Film teaser for Mammuk, Bozzetto's project in (34 mb)

1938 births
Italian animated film directors
Italian animated film producers
Italian comics artists
Italian satirists
Italian parodists
Parody film directors
Film people from Milan
Living people
Flash artists